Kenjiro Jitsui (born 16 December 1968) is a Japanese long-distance runner. He competed in the men's marathon at the 1996 Summer Olympics.

References

1968 births
Living people
Athletes (track and field) at the 1996 Summer Olympics
Japanese male long-distance runners
Japanese male marathon runners
Olympic athletes of Japan
Place of birth missing (living people)
20th-century Japanese people
21st-century Japanese people
Universiade medalists in athletics (track and field)
Universiade silver medalists for Japan
Medalists at the 1991 Summer Universiade